This is a list of Monuments of National Importance (ASI) as officially recognized by and available through the website of the Archaeological Survey of India in the Indian union territory of Ladakh. The monument identifier is a combination of the abbreviation of the subdivision of the list (state, ASI circle) and the numbering as published on the website of the ASI. 15 Monuments of National Importance have been recognized by the ASI in Ladakh.

List of monuments of national importance 

|}

See also 
 List of Monuments of National Importance in India for other Monuments of National Importance in India

References 

Ladakh
Monuments
Buildings and structures in Ladakh